UFC Fight Night: Lamas vs. Penn (also known as UFC Fight Night 97) was a planned mixed martial arts event that was set to be held by the Ultimate Fighting Championship on October 15, 2016, at the Mall of Asia Arena in Pasay, Philippines.

Background
The event in Pasay was supposed to be the second that the organization hosted in the Philippines, with the first being UFC Fight Night: Edgar vs. Faber on May 16, 2015. The entire event was supposed to stream live on UFC Fight Pass.

A featherweight bout between former title challenger Ricardo Lamas and former UFC Lightweight and Welterweight Champion B.J. Penn was expected to serve as the main event. However, on October 4, Penn pulled out of the fight citing an injury. In turn, the promotion announced on October 6 that they had cancelled the event entirely.

The remaining fighters on the card were all awarded their contracted show money despite not competing. All of the fighters on the card were rebooked for future events. This was the third time, following UFC 151 in September 2012, and UFC 176 in August 2014 that the promotion elected to cancel an event because of a lack of a high-profile fight to fill a main event spot.

A lightweight bout between Damir Hadžović and Yusuke Kasuya, initially scheduled for UFC 203, was postponed after Hadžović experienced an issue with his travel visa. The pairing was rescheduled and was expected to take place at this event.

Mehdi Baghdad was expected to face Jon Tuck at the event. However, Baghdad pulled out of the fight in mid-September citing injury and was replaced by promotional newcomer Alexander Volkanovski.

Cancelled fight card

See also
List of UFC events
2016 in UFC

References

UFC Fight Night
Cancelled Ultimate Fighting Championship events
2016 in mixed martial arts
2016 in Philippine sport
Mixed martial arts in the Philippines
October 2016 sports events in Asia